The Avonair Cash Spiel is an annual bonspiel, or curling tournament, that takes place at the Avonair Curling Club in Edmonton, Alberta. The tournament is held in a round robin format. The tournament started in 2013 as part of the World Curling Tour's regional developmental series of events.

Past champions

Men

Women

References

External links
Avonair Curling Club Home

World Curling Tour events
Women's World Curling Tour events
Sport in Edmonton
Curling in Alberta